San Giovanni di Val d'Era (or Villaggio San Giovanni), known also as Borgo Bocioni, is a village in Tuscany, central Italy, administratively a frazione of the comune of Lajatico, province of Pisa. At the time of the 2001 census its population was 93.

San Giovanni is about 50 km from Pisa and 4 km from Lajatico.

References 

Frazioni of the Province of Pisa